From Beyond may refer to:

"From Beyond" (short story), a 1934 story by H. P. Lovecraft
From Beyond (film), a 1986 film based on the Lovecraft story
From Beyond (Massacre album), 1991
From Beyond (Enforcer album), 2015

See also
 Beyond (disambiguation)